Spira Mirabilis is a 2016 Italian documentary film directed by Massimo D'Anolfi and Martina Parenti. It was selected to compete for the Golden Lion at the 73rd Venice International Film Festival.

References

External links
 

2016 films
2016 documentary films
Italian documentary films
2010s Italian-language films
2010s Italian films